Lieutenant-Colonel George Rodney, 2nd Baron Rodney (25 December 1753 – 2 January 1802), was a British soldier and politician.

Rodney was the son of Admiral George Rodney, 1st Baron Rodney, by his first wife Lady Jane Compton, daughter of the Honourable Charles Compton. His mother died when he was three years old. Rodney was a captain in the 3rd Foot Guards and a lieutenant-colonel in the British Army. In 1780 he was returned to Parliament for Northampton, a seat he held until 1784. In 1792 he entered the House of Lords on the death of his father and inherited Old Alresford House, built by his father at  Old Alresford, Hampshire.

Lord Rodney married Anne Harley, daughter of the Honourable Thomas Harley, in 1781. They had nine sons and one daughter. He died in January 1802, aged 48, and was succeeded by his eldest son, George. Lady Rodney died in April 1840, aged 80.

References

1753 births
1802 deaths
Scots Guards officers
Rodney, George
Rodney, George
George 02